High Knob is a mountain summit on the border between Hampshire and Hardy counties in West Virginia's Eastern Panhandle. High Knob is known for its overlook of The Trough and of points in three counties. A historical marker was placed on U.S. Route 220/West Virginia Route 28 noting its scenic and historical value. Geologically, High Knob is a summit of Mill Creek Mountain.

References

Mountains of Hampshire County, West Virginia
Mountains of Hardy County, West Virginia
Mountains of West Virginia